John Allan Greene was an American politician, who served in the Arizona State Senate from 1991 to 1996. A member of the Arizona Republican Party, he represented the 24th Senate District, and served as president of the senate from 1993 until the end of his term.

A native of New York, Greene was educated in law at St. John's University and New York University before launching his career in corporate and tax law.

Following the end of his term in the state senate, he was appointed as head of the state insurance department in 1997 by Governor Fife Symington. He was a candidate in the Republican primaries for the Arizona Attorney General election in 2002, losing to Andrew Thomas. He subsequently announced his candidacy for the Republican nomination for Governor of Arizona in the 2006 Arizona gubernatorial election, but withdrew from the race.

In 2011, he was appointed as director of the Arizona Department of Revenue by governor Jan Brewer, holding that role until his death in 2013.

References

1948 births
2013 deaths
Politicians from Phoenix, Arizona
Republican Party Arizona state senators
20th-century American politicians
21st-century American politicians
Presidents of the Arizona Senate